Kazakhstan competed at the 2016 Summer Paralympics in Rio de Janeiro, Brazil, from 7 September to 18 September 2016. 11 athletes in 5 sports won 2 medals. Zulfiya Gabidullina won gold with World Record in Swimming, Women's freestyle 100 m (S3). Raushan Koyshibayeva won silver in Powerlifting. Kazakhstan athletes finished 58th in medal count.

Competitors
The following is the list of number of competitors participating in the Games:

Disability classifications 

Every participant at the Paralympics has their disability grouped into one of five disability categories; amputation, the condition may be congenital or sustained through injury or illness; cerebral palsy; wheelchair athletes, there is often overlap between this and other categories; visual impairment, including blindness; Les autres, any physical disability that does not fall strictly under one of the other categories, for example dwarfism or multiple sclerosis. Each Paralympic sport then has its own classifications, dependent upon the specific physical demands of competition. Events are given a code, made of numbers and letters, describing the type of event and classification of the athletes competing. Some sports, such as athletics, divide athletes by both the category and severity of their disabilities, other sports, for example swimming, group competitors from different categories together, the only separation being based on the severity of the disability.

Archery
Archery at the 2016 Summer Paralympics – Men's individual compound open

Athletics

Judo
Judo at the 2016 Summer Paralympics – Men's 60 kg

Judo at the 2016 Summer Paralympics – Men's 73 kg

Powerlifting
Powerlifting at the 2016 Summer Paralympics – Women's 50 kg

Powerlifting at the 2016 Summer Paralympics – Women's 67 kg

Powerlifting at the 2016 Summer Paralympics – Men's 97 kg

Swimming
Swimming at the 2016 Summer Paralympics – Women's 50 metre freestyle S4

Swimming at the 2016 Summer Paralympics – Women's 100 metre freestyle S3

Medalists

See also 
 Kazakhstan at the 2016 Summer Olympics
 Kazakhstan at the Paralympics

References 

Nations at the 2016 Summer Paralympics
2016
2016 in Kazakhstani sport